Antonio Pennarella (27 May 1960 – 24 August 2018) was an Italian actor.

Biography
Pennarella began his acting career on TV in the 1980s and became in the following 30 years one of the most known faces on the TV screen, getting roles for TV series such as Un Posto al Sole.

During his career he worked with directors like Marco Bellocchio, Francesco Maselli, Mario Martone and Daniele Luchetti.

He died on 24 August 2018, aged 58, after a long illness.

Partial filmography
 
 The Butterfly's Dream (1994)
 Black Holes (1995)
 The Vesuvians (1997)
 Red Moon (2001)
 Pater Familias (2002)
 On My Skin (2003)
 Mario's War (2005)
 The Red Shadows (2009)
 Noi credevamo (2010)
 Piazza Fontana: The Italian Conspiracy (2012)
 Those Happy Years (2013)
 Song'e Napule (2013)
 Perez. (2014)
 The Legendary Giulia and Other Miracles (2015)
 Natale col Boss (2015)
 A Holy Venetian Family (2015)
 Indivisible (2016)

References

External links
 

1960 births
2018 deaths
Italian male film actors
20th-century Italian male actors
21st-century Italian male actors
Male actors from Naples